Russian Lake is a lake located west of Raquette Lake, New York. Fish species present in the lake are black bullhead, and yellow perch. There is trail access from the east shore of Big Moose Lake.

References

Lakes of Hamilton County, New York
Lakes of New York (state)